The Philippine spine-tailed swift (Mearnsia picina), also known as the Philippine needletail or Philippine spinetail, is a species of swift in the family Apodidae. It is endemic to the Philippines found in the islands of Mindanao and Visayas.  Its natural habitat is tropical moist lowland forests. It is becoming rare due to habitat loss.

Description 

EBird describes the bird as "A little-known medium-sized, short-tailed swift found over forest, usually at higher elevations. Mainly black with obvious white throat and underwing patches. Wing shape is unusual, with a “cut-out” next to the body and pointed wing tips curved backward. Tail square, with spines that are difficult to see. Distinguished from other swifts in its range by the white marks under the wings. Voice unknown."

It is differentiated from its southern counterpart by its cream colored throat, cheek and belly versus the bluish-white parts of the Southern silvery kingfisher.

Habitat and Conservation Status 
It appears to be reliant upon forested streams below 1,000 m and will tolerate secondary and selectively logged forest and even streamside vegetation within coconut plantations, close to forest edge.

IUCN has assessed this bird as near threatened.This species' main threat is habitat loss with wholesale clearance of forest habitats as a result of logging, agricultural conversion and mining activities occurring within the range. The close association with lowland forests suggests that this species may be highly susceptible to habitat loss through commercial logging, conversion for agriculture and plantation forestry, as well as urban developments and mining

References

Philippine spine-tailed swift
Birds of the Philippines
Endemic birds of the Philippines
Near threatened animals
Near threatened biota of Asia
Philippine spine-tailed swift
Philippine spine-tailed swift
Taxonomy articles created by Polbot